Macrotarsipus africana is a moth of the family Sesiidae described by William Beutenmüller in 1899. It is known from Cameroon, Equatorial Guinea and Gabon.

References

Sesiidae
Moths of Africa
Moths described in 1899